The  is a single-car diesel multiple unit (DMU) train type operated on local regional services by Shikoku Railway Company (JR Shikoku) in Japan since 1990.

Operations
The 1000 series trains are used on the following JR Shikoku lines.
 Kōtoku Line
 Tokushima Line
 Mugi Line
 Dosan Line

Build details and variants
A total of 56 1000 series cars were built by Niigata Transys between 1990 and 1997, delivered in four batches as shown below.

Interior
Passenger accommodation consists of a mixture of longitudinal bench seating on one side and transverse seating bays on the opposite side. Toilets have been retro-fitted to a number of cars since February 2001.

History
In 2008, 18 1000 series cars were modified to make them compatible with newly delivered 1500 series DMU cars, and were reclassified as 1200 series.

References

External links

 1000 series details on JR Shikoku website 

1000 series
1000 series
Train-related introductions in 1990
Niigata Transys rolling stock